Vidya is an Indian given name. It may refer to:

Women
Vidya Bal (1937-2020), Marathi feminist and writer
Vidya Balan, Indian actress
Vidya Dehejia, professor and  Padma Bhushan recipient
Vidya Rao, Hindustani classical singer and writer
Vidya Sinha (1947-2019), Indian actress
Vidya Subramaniam (1957-), Tamil author
Vidya Subramanian, Carnatic vocalist and teacher

Men

Vidya Niwas Mishra (1926-2005), scholar and Padma Bushan recipient

See also
 Vidya (disambiguation)

Indian feminine given names